One Man Band Man is the debut studio album by American hip hop recording artist and record producer Swizz Beatz, released on August 21, 2007, through Full Surface and Universal Motown Records. The album features guest appearances from Drag-On, Lil Wayne, R. Kelly and Jadakiss. The album's production was handled by Swizz Beatz himself, as well as producers such as The Individualz, Needlz, Nottz, Snags, Neo Da Matrix, Eric McCaine, Young World Music.

Background and development 
Swizz Beatz announced he was working on his first solo album on November 14, 2006 at Green Lantern's  mixshow. The first offering was "Come and Get Me" featuring Cassidy and produced by Buckwild. Swizz said this about it: "This is the warm up... the push up before you hit the bar. I'm tired of playing the back. It's showtime. I'm ready to get it poppin'... come and get me."

The song "Part of the Plan" was supposed to be the third official single but due to low record sales and not enough promotion it was eventually dropped. The music video was supposed to be based on the movie Crash and was supposed to be directed by the director of the movie himself, Paul Haggis. The video was also set to be shot in London. It was replaced with "Top Down," whose video is seen at the end of the music video for "Money in the Bank."

Commercial performance 
One Man Band Man debuted at number 7 on the US Billboard 200, selling 45,000 copies in its first week, the album fell quickly, falling to 42 in its second week and 52 in its third. It also debuted at number one on the Billboard Top R&B/Hip-Hop Albums chart. By September 20, 2008, the album had sold 159,400 copies in the United States.

Track listing 

Sample credits
"It's Me Bitches" contains a sample of "Hollywood Babylon", as performed by Crazy Town.
"Bust Ya Gunz" embodies portions of "Down Bottom", as performed by Drag-On.
"Take a Picture" contains a sample of "Lovely Day", as performed by Bill Withers.
"Top Down" contains a sample of "Girl, Come on Home", as performed by Major Lance.
"Money in the Bank" contains a sample of "Eric B. Is President", as performed by Eric B & Rakim.
"Part of the Plan" contains a sample of "X&Y", as performed by Coldplay.
"It's Me... (Remix)" contains a sample of "Get Me Bodied", as performed by Beyoncé and "C.R.E.A.M.", as performed by Wu-Tang Clan.

Charts

References

2007 debut albums
Full Surface Records albums
Swizz Beatz albums
Universal Records albums
Albums produced by Swizz Beatz
Albums produced by Nottz
Albums produced by Neo da Matrix